Gianluca De Angelis may refer to:

Gianluca De Angelis (footballer born 1967) Italian footballer active 1985–2005, Serie B, C1, C2 players
Gianluca De Angelis (footballer born 1981) Italian footballer active since 2000, Serie C1 and C2 players